Hwang Jini or Hwang Jin-yi (1506 – 1567), also known by her gisaeng name Myeongwol ("bright moon"), was one of the most famous gisaeng of the Joseon Dynasty. She lived during the reign of King Jungjong. She was noted for her exceptional beauty, charming quick wit, extraordinary intellect, and her assertive and independent nature. She has become an almost myth-like figure in modern Korea, inspiring novels, operas, films, and television series.

A crater on Venus, Hwangcini, is named after her.

Life 
Hwang was born around 1506 to a politician's son, Hwang Jin-sa (황진사), and a woman named Jin Hyeon-geum (진현금) who was either a kisaeng or of Cheonmin status. The story goes that her parents met while her mother was doing laundry, but the two could not get married and she became the youngest illegitimate daughter of Hwang. Her father was from a noble family in Kaeseong. Legend has it that she was born as the daughter of a blind commoner. It is said that even at the time of liberation in 1945, mineral water came out in the hill of the well at the mouth of Jangdan, where she lived.

She was known for her beauty and her bold personality. As Hwang Jini grew older, many men wanted to marry her. According to legend, one day a coffin was passing in front of her house, but the coffin stopped and refused to move from her house just listening to her read her poetry. She then ran out and stripped off her outer skirt from her hanbok to cover the coffin, and only then did the coffin started to move again. The coffin was said to have carried the body of her lover who was born of a higher class, but due to her lower status the two could not wed and the man died of a broken heart. She then decided to become a gisaeng after losing her lover at the age of 15.

Women during the Joseon dynasty were restricted inside the houses and were considered property. They could not marry whoever they wanted and a daughter born out of wedlock was considered an untouchable. Hwang Jini chose to become a gisaeng in order to escape the strict rules that women had to follow during the Joseon Dynasty. Hwang Jini refused to follow strict social norms for women and chose the life of a gisaeng giving her the freedom to learn not only dance and music, but also art, literature, and poetry - topics that were not normally taught to young women during the time.

Hwang Jini's beauty was famous throughout the Korean peninsula. It is said that her beauty shined even if she was bare faced and had her hair pulled back out of her face. She was clever, witty, and artistic. Many men of the upper class and lower classes alike came from all over just to see her and her performances. Like many other gisaengs at the time, she asked a riddle to the men who came to visit her and only those who passed could interact and talk with her. The riddle would be later known as the “Jeomiligu Idubulchool” (점일이구 이두불출/點 一 二 口 牛 頭 不出). Legend has it that she gave such difficult riddles in order to meet a man that was just as intellectual as her so that she may one day also get a husband, and the only man who solved it was a yangban by the name of Seo Gyeong-deok.

Life as a Gisaeng
Gisaengs were female entertainers in a male-oriented society whose history dates back to the Silla dynasty. They were officially sanctioned as an entertainer from a young age, being educated in poetry, music, and dance. Although gisaengs were more educated than most women, they were still considered the lowest social class called cheonmin in the Choson Dynasty due to their occupations being close to a prostitutes’. Gisaengs typically provided entertainment such as performances, including singing sijo poems and dancing, for the men in the highest social class, yangban. They trained to entertain various men throughout their lives as gisaeng, but had to face the reality that gisaengs will never be the first wives of yangban men. Gisaengs in this period sought a way to express themselves and their emotions through musical instrument performances, writing sijo poems, and composing songs. Furthermore, most of the songs by gisaengs were about sorrowful feelings and love.

Works

Hwang Jini's riddle
Hwang Jini was known for her intellect and wit. Her most famous written work was the "Jeomiligu Idubulchool" (점일이구 이두불출/點 一 二 口 牛 頭 不出). She gave the riddle to any man who wanted to be her lover and she waited for many years until one man came and solved the riddle. The answer to the riddle; however, was in the title. "When combining the variations in the title the first part 'Jeomiligu' (점일이구/點 一 二 口) created the Chinese character meaning spoken word (言) and the second part Idubulchool; (이두불출/  牛 頭 不出) created the Chinese character meaning day (午). When you combine both words together it creates the Chinese character meaning consent (許). The reason being that whoever solved her riddle she would allow him to come into her house and share a bed with him."  This being one of her most famous written works shows her wit and intellect that most women during the time were not able to share with the rest of the world.

Only a handful of sijo (Korean verse form) and geomungo pieces exist today. They show skilled craftsmanship of words and of musical arrangement. Hwang's sijo often describe the beauty and sites of Gaeseong (such as the palace of Manwoldae and the Pakyon Falls in the Ahobiryong Mountains), the personal tragedy of her lost loves and responses to famous classic Chinese poems and literature (the majority of them reflecting on lost love).

Hwang appears to have been of noble birth. Her sijo are considered the most beautiful ever written. In the following poem, the term Hwang uses for her beloved (어론님) has two meanings, alluding to both her sweetheart and a person who has been frozen by the winter cold. The English phrase "frozen love" may help to illustrate this double entendre in translation.

In this next poem, "Full Moon" is a play on Hwang's pen name, Myeongwol (literally, "Bright Moon"; 명월). The poem was written to a man famed for his virtue, Byok Kye Su, whom Hwang infamously seduced. "Green water" is a pun on Byok's name (벽계수 碧溪水).

Blue Stream
The Blue Stream  is a poem that is full of metaphors and representations of various aspects in her life. The poem uses a brilliant metaphor, using “Blue Stream” to represent Hwang Jini's lover, a man named Lee Changon also known as Byok Kye Su and Lee Jongsuk.  The first line represents her telling Lee Changon not to move past her, and she represents herself as the mountain and him as a stream. Once the stream, Lee Changon, reaches the sea it doesn't come back. The word “Moonlight” in the third line is Hwang Jini’s Gisaeng name, “Myeongwol,”  meaning bright moon light; using moonlight as a metaphor to represent herself in the poem. In this sense, the poem hints that he won’t come back to her. As a gisaeng, her life is within the limitations of the lowest social class as a cheonmin. Through this poem, Hwang Jini tells Lee Changon to take his time and to stay with her for a while. This poem represents longing and love; as well as her raw emotions of not wanting to separate from a loved one. Hwang Jini’s career as a Gisaeng may become complicated if she falls in love with a client, and this poem represents the complex depth of emotions that many Gisaengs held during the time. They were more privileged than the regular women of society in the aspect of having the freedom to read or write poetry, learn music and dance performances. However, gisaengs could never be the first wife of a yangban, or ever be respected as a woman due to their social class and stereotypes. Although this reality is a part of their job, this poem, Blue Stream, does an excellent job in depicting the struggles of feelings and work that gisaengs went through.

Writing Style and Gisaeng Poets
Hwang Jini had written a handful of poems during her lifetime, many of which are famously known and taught still to this day in the Korean education system. Of her remaining works, there are 7 hansi, or Korean poetry in Chinese characters, and 6 sijos [1]. She became a famous Korean poet due to these hansis and sijos. Her literary work was mainly centered around love, parting, and sorrow. Additionally, through her writing, she allowed people to understand what a gisaeng’s life was like as she often wrote about her own life. Hwang Jini expressed her emotions in sijos in a different way than her male counterparts as they were not as informal as hers . As a gisaeng poet, especially a highly regarded one, she was allowed to mock elite men and add humor through metaphors in her sijos. She wasn’t criticized for this as gisaengs were of low class and people didn’t put much meaning behind things that they said. In regards to her works about love, she often talked more about devotion to a lover than seduction, which was often correlated with Gisaengs. Due to her low social class level as well as occupation as a gisaeng, the tone of her poems tend to be on longing and devotion to love.

In popular culture

Literature
In the late 20th century, Hwang Jini's story began to attract attention from both sides of the Korean divide and feature in a variety of novels, operas, films and television series. Novelizations of her life include a 2002 treatment by North Korean writer Hong Sok-jung (which became the first North Korean novel to win a literary award, the Manhae Prize, in the South) and a 2004 bestseller by South Korean writer Jeon Gyeong-rin.

Film and television
 Portrayed by Lee Mi-sook in the 1982 MBC TV TV series Hwang Jin Yi
 Portrayed by Chang Mi-hee in the 1986 film Hwang Jin Yi
 Portrayed by Ha Ji-won and Shim Eun-kyung in the 2006 KBS2 TV series Hwang Jini
 Portrayed by Song Hye-kyo and Kim Yoo-jung in the 2007 film Hwang Jin Yi
 Portrayed by Kwon Na-ra in the 2020 KBS2 TV series Royal Secret Agent
Portrayed by Korean-American Drag Queen HoSo Terra Toma in 2021 on season four of American drag competition series The Boulet Brothers' Dragula

See also
 Korean culture
 Korean dance
 Goryeo

References

Sources

External links
 Two sijo attributed to Hwang, translated by Larry Gross
 Hwang Jinyi: Navercast 

Korean female dancers
Korean artists
Kisaeng
Korean scholars
Korean Confucianists
16th-century Korean women writers
16th-century writers
16th-century Korean painters
Year of birth unknown
Year of death unknown
Korean women writers
Korean musicians
Korean women poets
16th-century Korean poets
16th-century Korean women
16th-century musicians
16th-century dancers